Écija Balompié, S.A.D. is a Spanish football team based in Écija, in the autonomous community of Andalusia. Founded in 1939, it plays in División de Honor Andaluza, the fifth tier of Spanish football.

History 
In 2007–08 season, the club became champion of the Segunda División B, Group 4. The next season was quite unsuccessful, as the club finished 14th, just 5 points away from being relegated to Tercera. In August 2019, with a debt of 217,000 euros unpaid, Écija were expelled from the 2019–20 Tercera División.

Season to season

2 seasons in Segunda División
21 seasons in Segunda División B
10 seasons in Tercera División

Stadium
Écija holds home games at Estadio San Pablo, with a capacity of 6,000 seats.

Famous players

 Nolito
 Rafael Gordillo
 Rubén Pérez
 Wilfred Agbonavbare
 Antoñito
 Pepe Mel
 Salva Ballesta
 Caye Quintana
 Javi Lara
 Fernando Seoane
 Vali Gasimov

References

External links
Official website 
Futbolme team profile 

 
Football clubs in Andalusia
Association football clubs established in 1968
1968 establishments in Spain
Segunda División clubs